The Missa Sancti Bernardi von Offida is a mass in B-flat major by Joseph Haydn, Hob. XXII:10, Novello 1, was written the same year as the Missa in tempore belli (1796), and it "may have been the first mass Haydn wrote after his return from England." Yet it may also have been the second. It is usually given as Haydn's ninth setting of the mass, though its Hoboken number is XXII:10.  This mass was written in honor of St. Bernard of Offida, a Capuchin monk who devoted himself to helping the poor; a century after the monk's death, he was beatified by Pope Pius VI.

Scored for four soloists, choir, 2 oboes, clarinets (a later revision expanded their part), 2 bassoons, 2 trumpets in B-flat, timpani, strings and organ, the latter supplying figured bass for most of the duration.

The setting is divided into six movements.

 Kyrie Adagio - Allegro moderato, B-flat major, 3/4
 Gloria Vivace, B-flat major, common time 
 "Gratias agimus tibi" Allegretto, G minor, 3/4 
 "Qui tollis peccata mundi" Più allegro, G minor, 3/4
 "Quoniam tu solus sanctus" Vivace, common time
 Credo Allegro, B-flat major, cut time
 "Et incarnatus est" Adagio, E-flat major, 3/4 
 "Et resurrexit" Allegro, B-flat major, 3/4 
 "Et vitam venturi" Vivace assai, B-flat major, 3/4
 Sanctus Adagio, B-flat major, cut time
 "Pleni sunt coeli" Allegro, B-flat major, 3/4
 Benedictus Moderato, E-flat major, 2/4
 Agnus Dei Adagio, B-flat minor, 3/4 
 "Dona nobis pacem" Allegro, B-flat major, 3/4

The Sanctus section of the mass is a setting of a then-popular Austrian tune to the German translation of Sanctus, "Heilig". The Mass takes its popular German title Heiligmesse from this section.  
The mass includes what are, for the time, unexpected modulations and innovative use of third relations that would influence later mass settings by nineteenth-century composers. The Quoniam in Anton Bruckner's Missa Solemnis in B-flat minor quotes this mass.

Notes

References

 Hawkshaw, Paul (2004). "Bruckner's large sacred compositions" The Cambridge Companion to Bruckner edited by Williamson, John. Cambridge University Press. Cambridge. 
 Heartz, Daniel (2009). Mozart, Haydn and Early Beethoven: 1781 — 1802 W. W. Norton & Co. New York. 
 Hugues, Rosemary (1974). Haydn. J. M. Dent & Sons Ltd. London.
 Larsen, Jans Peter; Feder, Georg (1997). The New Grove Haydn W. W. Norton & Co. New York. .
 Schenbeck, Lawrence (1996). Joseph Haydn and the Classical Choral Tradition. Hinshaw Music. Chapel Hill, North Carolina.
 Strimple, Nick (2008). Choral music in the nineteenth century. Hal Leonard. New York.

External links 
 
 

Masses by Joseph Haydn
Compositions in B-flat major
1796 compositions